KKSI (101.5 FM, "101.5 KISS FM") is a radio station licensed to serve Eddyville, Iowa, United States.  The station, established in 1990, is owned by Greg List, through licensee O-Town Communications, Inc.

KKSI broadcasts a classic rock music format to the greater Ottumwa, Iowa, area.  Although its tower and transmitter are located near Eddyville, between Ottumwa and Oskaloosa, the KKSI radio studios are located in Ottumwa.

The station was assigned the KKSI call sign by the Federal Communications Commission on April 27, 1990.

References

External links
KKSI official website
Ottumwa Radio - O-Town Communications, Inc.

KSI
Radio stations established in 1990
Wapello County, Iowa
Classic rock radio stations in the United States
1990 establishments in Iowa